Costantino Bertolla (born 17 May 1963) is a former Italian male mountain runner who won 1990 World Mountain Running Championships.

Biography
He won also one national championships at individual senior level.

National titles
Italian Mountain Running Championships
Mountain running: 1991

References

External links
 

1963 births
Living people
Italian male mountain runners
World Mountain Running Championships winners
20th-century Italian people